The 2009 USTA LA Tennis Open was a professional tennis tournament played on outdoor hard courts. It was part of the 2009 ATP Challenger Tour. It took place in Carson, California, United States between May 23–31, 2009.

Singles entrants

Seeds

Rankings are as of May 18, 2009.

Other entrants
The following players received wildcards into the singles main draw:
  Alex Kuznetsov
  Michael McClune
  Kaes Van't Hof
  Donald Young

The following players received entry from the qualifying draw:
 Scott Oudsema
 Igor Sijsling
 Amir Weintraub
 Jesse Witten
 Marcel Felder (as a Lucky loser)

Champions

Men's singles

 Michael Russell def.  Michael Yani, 6–1, 6–1

Men's doubles

 Harsh Mankad /  Frederik Nielsen def.  Carsten Ball /  Travis Rettenmaier, 6–4, 6–4

References
Official website
ITF search 

USTA LA Tennis Open
Tennis tournaments in the United States
USTA LA Tennis Open
Sports competitions in Carson, California